The women's cycling team sprint at the 2012 Olympic Games in London took place at the London Velopark on 2 August.

Kristina Vogel and Miriam Welte of Germany won the gold medal with a time of 32.798 seconds. China won the silver medal and Australia took bronze.

Competition format

The team sprint is a two-lap race between two teams of two cyclists, starting on opposite sides of the track.  Each member of the team must lead for one of the laps.

The tournament consisted of an initial qualifying round. The top eight teams advanced to the first round. The first round comprised head-to-head races based on seeding (1st vs. 8th, 2nd vs. 7th, etc.). The winners of those four heats advanced to the medal round, with the two fastest winners competing in the gold medal final and the two slower winners facing off for bronze.

Schedule 
All times are British Summer Time

Results

Qualification

The ride of Varnish and Pendleton for Great Britain took place prior to that of Gong and Guo of China, and broke the existing world record. It was then immediately beaten by the Chinese team's time in the next heat.

First round

Great Britain won their heat with a time which would have qualified them for the gold medal match, but they were relegated for an early exchange.

Finals

Final bronze medal

Final gold medal

China had the best time in the final, but were relegated for an early exchange.

References

 Victoria Pendleton & Jess Varnish relegated from team sprint BBC

Cycling at the Summer Olympics – Women's team sprint
Track cycling at the 2012 Summer Olympics
Olymp
Women's events at the 2012 Summer Olympics